The Division of Moira was an Australian electoral division in the state of Victoria. It was located in the north-east of the state, covering much of the Shire of Moira, after which it was named. It included the towns of Benalla and Yarrawonga. The division was proclaimed in 1900, and was one of the original 65 divisions to be contested at the first federal election. It was abolished at the redistribution of 13 July 1906.

Members

Election results

1901 establishments in Australia
Constituencies established in 1901
Former electoral divisions of Australia